Midsummer Hill is situated in the range of Malvern Hills that runs approximately  north-south along the Herefordshire-Worcestershire border. It lies to the south of Herefordshire Beacon with views to Eastnor Castle.
To the north is Swinyard Hill.
It is the site of an Iron Age hill fort which spans Midsummer Hill and Hollybush Hill. The hillfort is protected as a Scheduled Ancient Monument and is owned by Natural England. It can be accessed via a footpath which leads south from the car park at British Camp on the A449 or a footpath which heads north from the car park in Hollybush on the A438.

Midsummer Hill Camp

The hillfort is very unusual in that the ramparts enclose two hills and the intervening valley. Bowden speculates that the spring within the valley "enhance[s] the position of the hillfort as a site of symbolic value".

The rampart and ditch were built around 390 BC and  it is thought that the settlement was occupied by 1500 people until it was destroyed by fire in AD 48.

Midsummer Hill in cultural life

In The Ley Hunter's Companion Paul Devereux theorised that a 10-mile alignment he called the "Malvern Ley" passed through St Ann's Well, the Wyche Cutting, a section of the Shire Ditch, Midsummer Hill, Whiteleaved Oak, Redmarley D'Abitot and Pauntley.

References

Further reading

External links

Midsummer Hill Camp Monument Detail
Aerial view of Midsummer Hill

Marilyns of England
Hills of Worcestershire
Malvern Hills
Hill forts in Herefordshire
Former populated places in Herefordshire